Theodorus of Egypt (died ~340) was a Coptic Christian monk and hermit who lived in the time of emperor Constantine the Great. Very little is known of his life. He was the desciple of Saint Amun and one of the first desert fathers in the Nile area. Athanasius of Alexandria and Saint Gregory the Great mentions him in their writings.

His feast day in the Chatholic Church is on 7 January.

References 

Saints from Roman Egypt
Egyptian Christian monks
4th-century Christian saints
Desert Fathers